Andriy Radchenko (born 12 November 1972, Kharkiv) is a Ukrainian businessman, banker, manager of agrarian sector. He is the head of state-owned company PJSC "Agrarian fund", which is one of the leading operators of the agrarian market of Ukraine.

Biography 

Andriy Radchenko received his higher education at the universities of Kharkiv.

In 1994 he graduated from the H.S. Skovoroda Kharkiv National Pedagogical University (mathematics).

In 1997 he graduated from the Karazin University (economics).

Married. Has a son.

Professional career 

Andriy Radchenko started his professional activity in 1994 at JSCIB "UkrSibbank". He worked there until 2003 and rose from a specialist to the head of a retail business.

Since 2003 Andriy Radchenko has held positions in various financial institutions: "Finance and Credit", "Index Bank", Credit Agricole SA, "Global Ukraine", "Phoenix-Capital".

In 2011, Radchenko became Managing Director of "Agro Solutions Group".

On 25 February 2015, Andriy Radchenko was appointed Chairman of the Board of PJSC "Agrarian fund".

He and his team took the company to the 8th position of the largest taxpayers of Ukraine in the wholesale of grain, unprocessed tobacco, seeds and animal feed (2017), and to 144th position of the largest Ukrainian companies (2018).

In August 2019 in Washington Andriy Radchenko held talks with lobbyists to create a land market in Ukraine.

References

External links 

 Andriy Radchenko biography on the website of the Agrarian fund

1972 births
Businesspeople from Kharkiv
Living people
National University of Kharkiv alumni
21st-century Ukrainian economists